Chocolat is a 2000 film, based on the 1999 novel Chocolat by the English author, Joanne Harris, directed by Lasse Hallström. Adapted by screenwriter Robert Nelson Jacobs, Chocolat tells the story of Vianne Rocher, played by Juliette Binoche, who arrives in the fictional French village of Lansquenet-sous-Tannes at the beginning of Lent with her six-year-old daughter, Anouk. She opens a small chocolaterie. Soon, she and her chocolate influence the lives of the townspeople of this repressed French community in different and interesting ways.

The film began a limited release in the United States on December 22, 2000, and went on general release on January 19, 2001. Critics gave the drama positive reviews and a number of accolades, praising its acting performances, its screenplay, and Rachel Portman's score. It received five nominations at the 73rd Academy Awards, including Best Picture. Binoche won the European Film Award for Best Actress for her performance, while Dench was awarded a Screen Actors Guild Award in 2001.

Plot
Vianne and her six year-old daughter Anouk, drift across Europe following the north wind like her mother before her. In 1959 they arrive in a quiet French village, overseen by mayor the Comte de Reynaud at the start of Lent. Vianne opens a chocolate shop and despite not fitting in well with the townspeople, begins to make headway with some of the villagers to come to her shop. Reynaud, who will not admit his wife left him, speaks out against Vianne for tempting the people during Lent.

Armande, Vianne's elderly landlady, is one of her first allies. Armande's daughter Caroline, will not let her see her grandson Luc, as she is a "bad influence". Vianne arranges for him and his grandmother to meet in the chocolaterie, where they bond. After finding out about their secret meetings, Caroline reveals her mother is diabetic, but she continues to eat the chocolate when visiting the shop.

Vianne develops a friendship with Josephine, who is being physically abused by her husband Serge, the local café owner. Through their friendship, Josephine finds the courage to leave Serge after he beats her, moving in with Vianne and Anouk. As she works at the chocolate shop and learns the craft, her confidence slowly increases. Simultaneously, under Reynaud's instruction, Serge attempts to make amends for his abusiveness, eventually asking Josephine to come back to him, but she refuses. Later that night, a drunken Serge breaks into the shop, attacking both women, but Josephine knocks him out.

As the rivalry between Vianne and Reynaud intensifies, a band of river Romani camp near the village. Although most of the town objects to their presence, Vianne embraces them and a mutual attraction develops between her and the leader, Roux. They hold a birthday party for Armande with villagers on Roux's boat. When Caroline sees Luc dancing with his grandmother, she begins to accept that Armande's influence in her son's life may be positive. Luc takes Armande home after the party, while Josephine and Anouk fall asleep on a boat, which Serge sets fire to, while Roux and Vianne make love on a barge in the river. No one is hurt in the fire, but Vianne is shaken. Armande later dies in her home and is discovered by Luc, devastating both him and his mother; meanwhile Roux packs up and leaves with his group.

Reynaud initially believes the fire was divine intervention until Serge confesses to starting it, saying he thought it was what he wanted. Horrified, Reynaud orders him to leave the village and not to come back.

With the return of the north wind, Vianne decides she cannot win against Reynaud, and decides to move on. Anouk, now attached to the town, refuses to go and during a scuffle, the urn containing Vianne's mother's ashes breaks, scattering them over the floor. While recovering the ashes, Vianne sees the townspeople and the positive influence she's had on their lives and decides to stay.

Despite shifting sentiment in the town, Reynaud remains staunch in his abstinence of eating any chocolate. On the Saturday evening before Easter, Reynaud sees Caroline, to whom he is attracted, leaving the chocolaterie and is devastated. He breaks into the shop that night, smashing the special window display for the Easter festival. After a morsel of chocolate falls on his lip, he devours much of the chocolate in the window before collapsing in tears and falling asleep. The next morning, Vianne wakes him and gives him a drink to help him. Reynaud apologizes for his behavior. The town's young priest Père Henri gives a sermon emphasizing the importance of humanity over divinity.

The narrator, a grown-up Anouk, reveals that the sermon and festival are a success. Reynaud and Caroline start a relationship half a year later. Josephine takes over Serge's café, renaming it Café Armande. The north wind returns, but this time Vianne throws her mother's ashes out into the wind. Anouk concludes the story: Roux returns in the summer to be with Vianne and Anouk.

Cast

 Juliette Binoche as Vianne Rocher
 Victoire Thivisol as Anouk Rocher, Vianne's daughter (voiced by Sally Taylor-Isherwood because Victoire's French accent made her difficult to understand)
 Judi Dench as Armande Voizin, Caroline's mother
 Alfred Molina as Comte de Reynaud, the mayor
 Lena Olin as Josephine Muscat, Serge's abused wife
 Johnny Depp as Roux, a self-described "river-rat" and Vianne's lover
 Hugh O'Conor as Pere Henri, village priest 
 Carrie-Anne Moss as Caroline Clairmont, Armande's daughter
 Aurélien Parent-Koenig as Luc Clairmont, Caroline's son 
 Peter Stormare as Serge Muscat, café owner 
 Hélène Cardona as Françoise "Fuffi" Drou, beauty shop proprietor
 Antonio Gil as Jean-Marc Drou
 Elisabeth Commelin as Yvette Marceau, woman who buys chocolates as an aphrodisiac
 Ron Cook as Alphonse Marceau, Yvette's husband 
 Leslie Caron as Madame Audel, village widow whose husband died in World War I
 John Wood as Guillaume Blerot, who carries a long-time yearning for Madame Audel
 Michèle Gleizer as Madame Rivet, village woman who works for the Comte 
 Dominique MacAvoy as Madame Pouget, village woman 
 Arnaud Adam as George Rocher, Vianne's father
 Christianne Oliveira as Chitza Rocher, Vianne's mother 
 Tatyana Yassukovich, the narrator

Production

Filming

Filming took place between May and August 2000 in the medieval village of Flavigny-sur-Ozerain in the region of Burgundy and on the Rue De L'ancienne Poste in Beynac-et-Cazenac in Dordogne. The river scenes were filmed at Fonthill Lake at Fonthill Bishop in Wiltshire and interior scenes at Shepperton Studios, England.

The film is dedicated to the memory of renowned cameraman Mike Roberts, who died in his sleep of natural causes during filming in England.

Music
Music written by Rachel Portman, except where noted.
"Minor Swing" (Django Reinhardt/Stéphane Grappelli) – 2:13
"Main Titles" – 3:07
"The Story of Grandmere" – 4:08
"Vianne Sets Up Shop" – 1:57
"Three Women" – 1:01
"Vianne Confronts the Comte" – 1:21
"Other Possibilities" – 1:34
"Guillaume's Confession" – 1:29
"Passage of Time" – 2:32
"Boycott Immorality" – 4:38
"Party Preparations" – 1:28
"Chocolate Sauce" – 0:48
"Fire" – 2:37
"Vianne Gazes at the River" – 1:06
"Mayan Bowl Breaks" – 2:14
"Taste of Chocolate" – 3:08
"Ashes to the Wind / Roux Returns" – 2:18
"Caravan" (Duke Ellington/Juan Tizol)– 3:43
Additionally: Erik Satie’s Gnossienne is heard in the scene where Viane tells the story of her parents’ meeting.

Reception

Box office
Chocolat grossed US$152,699,946 worldwide, on a production budget of US$25 million. It was not successful in France.

Critical reception
The film received a mixture of reviews from critics with some critics dismissive of the film's tone. The review aggregator website Rotten Tomatoes reported that 62% of 117 critics gave the film a positive review, with an average rating of 5.99/10. The website's critical consensus states, "Chocolat is a charmingly light-hearted fable with a lovely performance by Binoche". On Metacritic, which uses a normalized rating system, the film holds a 64/100 rating, based on 31 reviews, indicating "generally favorable reviews". Audiences polled by CinemaScore gave the film an average grade of "A" on an A+ to F scale.

Chicago Tribune critic Michael Wilmington called Chocolat "a delightful confection, a cream-filled (and slightly nutty) bon-bon of a [...] tantalizing, delectable and randy movie of melting eroticism and toothsome humor." He felt that the film "is a feast of fine actors – and every one of them is a joy to watch." Similarly, Peter Travers from Rolling Stone declared the project "a sinfully scrumptious bonbon [...] Chocolat may be slight, but don't discount Hallstrom's artful finesse [...] Except for some indigestible whimsy Chocolat is yummy." Roger Ebert, writing for the Chicago Sun-Times, gave the film three out of four stars. He found the film was "charming and whimsical, and Binoche reigns as a serene and wise goddess." New York Posts Lou Lumenick called Chocolat "the soothing cinematic equivalent of a warm cup of decadently rich cocoa," led by "melt-in-your-mouth performances" from Binoche, Molina and Dench.

In his review for Variety, Lael Loewenstein found that "Hallstrom couldn't have asked for a better cast to embody those themes; likewise, his production team has done an exquisite job of giving life to Robert Nelson Jacobs’ taut script. Chocolat [...] is a richly textured comic fable that blends Old World wisdom with a winking, timely commentary on the assumed moral superiority of the political right." Mick LaSalle of the Los Angeles Times remarked that the film was "as delectable as its title, but for all its sensuality it is ultimately concerned with the spirit." He noted that Chocolat "is a work of artistry and craftsmanship at the highest level, sophisticated in its conception and execution, yet possessed of wide appeal." The New York Times critic Elvis Mitchell found the film "extraordinarily well cast" and wrote: "This crowd-pleaser is the feature-film version of milk chocolate: an art house movie for people who don't like art house movies."

Lisa Schwarzbaum, writing for Entertainment Weekly, graded the film with a 'B−' rating, summarizing it "as agreeably sweet as advertised, with a particularly yummy performance by Juliette Binoche," while Jay Carr from The Boston Globe found that the film "may not be deep, but it certainly is lip-smacking." Mike Clark of USA Today was more cutting in his review, saying that there are "never enough goodies to keep the two-hour running time from seeming like three." In another negative review, Dennis Lim from The Village Voice criticized the film for its "condescending, self-congratulatory attack on provincial sanctimony." He called Chocolat an "airy, pseudo-folkloric gibberish at best."

Following the criticisms, Harvey Weinstein challenged the USA Today critic, Andy Seiler, to choose a venue where the film was showing to try to prove to him that audiences liked it even if not all critics did. After the screening in Washington D.C., Weinstein asked the audience for their feedback and no one said anything negative.

Accolades

References

External links

 
 
 
 Review, The New York Times

2000 films
American romance films
British romance films
Cooking films
2000 multilingual films
2000s French-language films
Films about Catholicism
Films about chocolate
Films about families
Films about Romani people
Films based on British novels
Films directed by Lasse Hallström
Films produced by David Brown
Films scored by Rachel Portman
Films set in France
Films set in 1959
Films shot in England
Films shot in France
Films with atheism-related themes
Films with screenplays by Robert Nelson Jacobs
Miramax films
2000s English-language films
American multilingual films
British multilingual films
French-language American films
2000s American films
2000s British films